Padmore may refer to:
Surname
Albert Padmore (born 1944), West Indies cricketer
Dawn Padmore (born 1967), Liberian classical singer and recitalist
George Padmore (1903–1959), Pan-Africanist, journalist, and author
Hal Padmore (1927–1995), Canadian cricketer
Mark Padmore (born 1961), British tenor
Thomas Padmore GCB (1909–1996), British civil servant (Permanent Secretary to the Treasury)
Given name
Padmore Enyonam Agbemabiese (born 1965), Ghanaian poet and scholar

See also
Padmanoor
Patmor
Patmore (disambiguation)
Pedmore